Zardini is an Italian surname. Notable people with the surname include:
Elsa Matilde Zardini (born 1949), Paraguayan/Argentinian botanist
Edoardo Zardini (disambiguation), multiple people
Mirko Zardini (born 1955), Italian curator
Sergio Zardini (1931–1966), Italian bobsledder

Italian-language surnames